Tetrasulfur tetranitride is an inorganic compound with the formula . This gold-poppy coloured solid is the most important binary sulfur nitride, which are compounds that contain only the elements sulfur and nitrogen. It is a precursor to many S-N compounds and has attracted wide interest for its unusual structure and bonding.

Nitrogen and sulfur have similar electronegativities. When the properties of atoms are so highly similar, they often form extensive families of covalently bonded structures and compounds.

Structure
 adopts an unusual “extreme cradle” structure, with D2d point group symmetry. It can be viewed as a derivative of a (hypothetical) eight-membered ring (or more simply a 'deformed' eight-membered ring) of alternating sulfur and nitrogen atoms. The pairs of sulfur atoms across the ring are separated by 2.586 Å, resulting in a cage-like structure as determined by single crystal X-ray diffraction. The nature of the transannular S–S interactions remains a matter of investigation because it is significantly shorter than the sum of the van der Waal's distances but has been explained in the context of molecular orbital theory. One pair of the transannular S atoms have valence 4, and the other pair of the transannular S atoms have valence 2.

Properties
 is stable to air. It is, however, unstable in the thermodynamic sense with a positive enthalpy of formation of +460 kJ/mol. This endothermic enthalpy of formation originates in the difference in energy of  compared to its highly stable decomposition products:

Because one of its decomposition products is a gas,  can be used as an explosive. Purer samples tend to be more explosive. Small samples can be detonated by striking with a hammer.  is thermochromic, changing from pale yellow below −30 °C to orange at room temperature to deep red above 100 °C.

Synthesis
 was first prepared in 1835 by M. Gregory by the reaction of disulfur dichloride with ammonia, a process that has been optimized:

Coproducts of this reaction include heptasulfur imide and elemental sulfur. A related synthesis employs  instead:

Acid-base reactions

The cage is distorted in these adducts.

This compound upon standing is isomerised to a complex in which a nitrogen atom forms the additional bond to the metal centre.

The soft Lewis acid CuCl forms a coordination polymer:

Dilute NaOH hydrolyzes  as follows, yielding thiosulfate and trithionate:

More concentrated base yields sulfite:

Metal complexes
 reacts with metal complexes. The cage remains intact in some cases but in other cases, it is degraded.  reacts with Vaska's complex ( in an oxidative addition reaction to form a six coordinate iridium complex where the  binds through two sulfur atoms and one nitrogen atom.

as a precursor to other S-N compounds
Reaction with piperidine generates :

A related cation is also known, i.e. .

Treatment with tetramethylammonium azide produces the heterocycle :

Cyclo- has 10 pi-electrons. 

In a related reaction, the use of the bis(triphenylphosphine)iminium azide gives a salt containing the blue  anion:

The anion  has a chain structure described using the resonance .

 reacts with electron-poor alkynes.

Chlorination of  gives thiazyl chloride.

Passing gaseous  over silver metal yields the low temperature superconductor polythiazyl or polysulfurnitride (transition temperature (0.26±0.03) K), often simply called "(SN)x". In the conversion, the silver first becomes sulfided, and the resulting  catalyzes the conversion of the  into the four-membered ring , which readily polymerizes.

Related compounds
The selenium analogue , tetraselenium tetranitride.

Safety
 is shock-sensitive. Purer samples are more shock-sensitive than those contaminated with elemental sulfur.

References

Explosive chemicals
Inorganic compounds
Sulfur–nitrogen compounds
Nitrides
Eight-membered rings